is an old province in the area of Fukushima Prefecture. It was sometimes called .

The province occupies the western half of the central part of Fukushima Prefecture; the eastern half is Iwaki Province. More precisely, Date and Adachi districts in the north belong to Iwashiro and Higashishirakawa and Nishishirakawa districts in the south belong to Iwaki. The border between the two provinces is the Abukuma River. The former ichinomiya of the province is Isasumi Shrine.

Timeline
 On December 7, 1868, the province was formed out from Mutsu Province.  As of 1872, the population was 427,933.

Historical districts
 Fukushima Prefecture
 Aizu Region, Fukushima
 Aizu District (会津郡)
 Kitaaizu District (北会津郡) - dissolved
 Minamiaizu District (南会津郡)
 Kawanuma District (河沼郡)
 Ōnuma District (大沼郡)
 Yama District (耶麻郡)
 Nakadōri Region, Fukushima
 Adachi District (安達郡)
 Asaka District (安積郡) - dissolved
 Date District (伊達郡)
 Iwase District (岩瀬郡)
 Shinobu District (信夫郡) - dissolved

See also
 Iwase Province
 Sanriku
 List of Provinces of Japan

Notes

References
 Nussbaum, Louis-Frédéric and Käthe Roth. (2005).  Japan encyclopedia. Cambridge: Harvard University Press. ;  OCLC 58053128

Other websites

  Murdoch's map of provinces, 1903

 
Former provinces of Japan
History of Fukushima Prefecture